Samuel Orace Dunn (March 8, 1877 – January 4, 1958) was an American transportation specialist.

Biography
He was born in Bloomfield, Iowa on March 8, 1877.  He began to set type at the age of 12. He learned the printing trade after graduating from high school, was editor of the Quitman, (Mo.) Record (1895–96) and associate editor of the Maryville, (Mo.) Tribune (1896–1900); from 1900 to 1904 was a reporter, and later editorial writer, on the Kansas City Journal, and in 1904-07 was connected with the Chicago Tribune as railroad editor and editorial writer.  In 1907-08 he was managing editor of the Railway Age, and thereafter editor of the Railway Age Gazette. He also contributed articles to periodicals and lectured frequently on transportation subjects and was an outspoken advocate on behalf of the railroad industry.  At the time of his death he was the chairman emeritus of Simmons-Boardman Publishing Corporation. He wrote:  
 American Transportation Question (1912)
 Government Ownership of Railways (1913)
 Railway Regulation or Ownership? (1918)
 Public Ownership of Public Utilities (1919), with William Bennett Munro, John Martin, and Delos Franklin Wilcox
  
"Sam Dunn Day" was held at the Chicago Railroad Fair on August 16, 1948 to commemorate his contributions to the railroad industry. He was referred to as "Uncle Orace" from his middle name by nephews. The middle name was used by other male family members, but the origin of the name is unknown.

 

American newspaper editors
American male journalists
People from Bloomfield, Iowa
1877 births
1958 deaths